William Warwick Hawkins (1816 – 8 February 1868) was a British Conservative politician.

Hawkins was elected Conservative MP for Colchester at the 1852 general election and held the seat until 1857 when he did not seek re-election.

References

External links
 

UK MPs 1852–1857
1816 births
1868 deaths
Conservative Party (UK) MPs for English constituencies